The Arthur Curtiss James House was a mansion located on 39 East 69th Street in New York City. It was constructed for Arthur Curtiss James.

Further reading 
 

Houses in Manhattan
Upper East Side